Warwick B. Smith (born 11 June 1971 in Perth) is a Scottish curler from Bridge of Earn, Perth and Kinross.

Career
Smith made his international debut at the 1996 World Curling Championships as the skip for the Scotland team. His debut was fairly successful, as the team would win the silver medal, losing to Canada's Jeff Stoughton in the final.

At the 1998 Championships, Warwick would play third for David Smith and the team finished in 4th place. The following year Warwick played third for Hammy McMillan and won gold, this time beating Jeff Stoughton's team in the final.

Smith was a member of the Great Britain 2002 Winter Olympics curling team. He played third for McMillan, but the team finished a disappointing 7th place. At that year's World Championship, Warwick skipped the Scotland team to a bronze medal. The following year, he skipped a team to a 7th-place finish. In 2004, he played third for Ewan MacDonald and finished 5th.

At the 2006 Winter Olympics, Smith played second for David Murdoch and finished 4th, but Smith had the highest accuracy of any curler in the men's competition round robin. The team then went on to win the World Championship.

For the next season, Smith built a new team with Ross Hepburn as lead, David Smith (no relation) as second, and Craig Wilson as third. After winning the Scottish Championship, they represented Scotland at the 2007 World Championship, with Ewan MacDonald being the alternate player. The team did not fare well there, compiling a 4–7 record and finishing 9th.

References

External links

1971 births
Living people
Scottish male curlers
British male curlers
Olympic curlers of Great Britain
Curlers at the 2002 Winter Olympics
Curlers at the 2006 Winter Olympics
World curling champions
European curling champions
Scottish curling champions
People from Perth and Kinross